General elections were held in Paraguay on 20 April 2008. Elections were held for the presidency, 45 senators, 80 representatives, 17 governors and Paraguay's members in the Mercosur Parliament.

The presidential election was won by opposition candidate Fernando Lugo of the Patriotic Alliance for Change, who defeated Blanca Ovelar of the long-ruling Colorado Party. The Colorado Party remained the largest in both houses of Congress despite losing several seats.

The election ended a 61-year hold on the presidency by the Colorados. The Colorados had held the presidency without interruption since 1947 (from 1947 to 1962 as the de jure sole legal party, and from 1962 to 1989 as the de facto sole legal party). Additionally, when Lugo took office on 15 August, it marked the first time since Paraguay gained independence in 1813 that an incumbent government peacefully transferred power to an elected member of the opposition.

Presidential candidates and campaigning 
The following candidates ran for president:
 Fernando Lugo, Patriotic Alliance for Change (APC)
 Lino Oviedo, National Union of Ethical Citizens (UNACE)
 Blanca Ovelar, Colorado Party (ANR-PC)
 Pedro Fadul, Beloved Fatherland Party (PPQ)

The incumbent president, Nicanor Duarte Frutos, was barred by the Constitution from running for reelection and instead supported his education secretary, Blanca Ovelar. Initial results in the Colorado Party's December 2007 primary showed Ovelar defeating former Vice President Luis Castiglioni, but the result was disputed, leading to a recount. On 21 January 2008, the Colorado Party electoral commission announced that Ovelar had won with 45.04% of the vote against 44.5% for Castiglioni, although Castiglioni continued to claim victory, alleging that 30,000 votes in his favor were "stolen", and said that he would take the matter to court. Ovelar said that her campaign would shift its focus from the "cruel primary campaign" to the general election and that her platform prioritized "fight against poverty and to the creation of jobs".

Lugo is a former bishop who resigned from the priesthood in December 2006 in preparation for his presidential bid.  As a priest, he required a permit from the Vatican to become directly involved in politics prior to 2006.  However, the Paraguayan constitution prohibits ministers of any faith from standing as a political candidate.  Despite his resignation, the Vatican regards priesthood as a lifelong commitment but has suspended him from his duties.

As bishop of San Pedro, a poor region, for ten years beginning in 1994, his support for landless peasants earned him a reputation as "the bishop of the poor".  He is an advocate of land reform and other measures to address poverty, but has distanced himself from leftists such as Hugo Chavez and Evo Morales, saying that he is not left-wing or right-wing but "in the middle". He vowed to end the Colorado Party's 61 year rule, fight corruption, and make Paraguay "a new country". According to Lugo, he believes "in the people's self-determination and in recovering sovereignty and independence". Lugo is backed by the Patriotic Alliance for Change (APC), which includes both left and right wing groups, notably the conservative Authentic Radical Liberal Party. President Duarte caused controversy just before the election by telling the Ultima Hora newspaper that Lugo "probably sells himself" for money from Venezuela, Bolivia, and Ecuador.

Ovelar, the Colorado candidate, said that she knew "what the people need and what has to be done". She said that she would focus on job creation and the strengthening of agricultural cooperatives, hoping to reduce the number of Paraguayans who emigrate for economic reasons. According to Ovelar, Paraguay has "new needs that were not obvious before ... and they require the touch of a woman". If elected, Ovelar would have been Paraguay's first female president.

Lino Oviedo's conviction for 1996 mutiny was overturned by the Supreme Court in October 2007, leaving him free to run for president. In January 2008 he was nominated as the candidate of his party, the National Union of Ethical Citizens, without opposition.

Ovelar held her last campaign rally in Asuncion on 16 April. Along with Oviedo and Fadul, she participated in a last televised debate in the early afternoon of 17 April; Lugo did not participate, and Ovelar criticized him for this. Lugo held his last rally in Asuncion later that night, with about 15,000 supporters present.

Opinion polls
A poll from September 2007 saw a three-way race develop between Lugo, Oviedo and the ANR-PC candidate.

A poll from November 2007 saw Lugo lead with over 40%, with Oviedo in second place and Castiglioni or Ovelar (it was still undetermined which of the pair would run) in third place.

A poll from March 2008 saw two way developing with  Lugo in the lead with 31%, Ovelar in second place with 27% and Oviedo in third place with 24%. A poll from  5 April 2008 saw Lugo and Ovelar in a statistical dead heat with Lugo in the lead with 30.9%, Ovelar in second with 30.1%, and Oviedo in third with 21.4%. More than 10% remained undecided.

Results
Shortly after the election, with results from 13,000 of 14,000 polling stations counted, Lugo had 41% of the vote against 31% for Ovelar and 22% for Oviedo. Lugo's supporters celebrated in the streets of Asuncion, and he declared that "today we've written a new chapter in our nation's political history". Ovelar conceded defeat, acknowledging that Lugo's lead was unassailable.
A couple of hours later, President Nicanor Duarte Frutos appeared at a press conference somberly but remarked that for the first time in the history of Paraguay a handover to the opposition will take place peacefully and in an orderly fashion.

In the gubernatorial election, the ANR won nine departments, the PLRA seven and the APC one.

In August, shortly before taking office, Lugo struck a deal with Oviedo, enabling him to govern with a parliamentary majority. Together, the Authentic Liberal Radical Party and National Union for Ethical Citizens will hold 25 out of 45 Senate seats and 44 out of 80 House of Representatives seats.

Lugo was sworn in as president on 15 August 2008.

President

Chamber of Deputies

Senate

References

Paraguay
General election
Elections in Paraguay
Presidential elections in Paraguay
Fernando Lugo
April 2008 events in South America